LOTS may refer to:

 LOTS (personality psychology), an acronym providing a broad classification of data source for personality psychology assessment
London Omnibus Traction Society, a bus society
Legend of the Seeker, a television series based on novels in the Sword of Truth series by Terry Goodkind
Legends of the Superheroes, a 1979 television series based on DC Comics characters.
Lucifer on the Sofa, a 2022 album by American rock band Spoon
 A linearly ordered topological space.

See also

Lot (disambiguation)
Lotts (disambiguation)